Johnny Sanders (1922–1990) was an American professional football executive.
 
Johnny Sanders may also refer to:

Johnny Sanders, character in arcade game Mach Breakers: Numan Athletics 2

See also
John Sanders (disambiguation)
Jonny Saunders (born 1975), British sports reporter